The St. Johns Bridge is a steel suspension bridge that spans the Willamette River in Portland, Oregon, United States, between the Cathedral Park neighborhood in North Portland and the Linnton and Northwest Industrial neighborhoods in Northwest Portland. It carries the U.S. Route 30 Bypass. It is the only suspension bridge in the Willamette Valley and one of three public highway suspension bridges in Oregon.

It is the tallest bridge in Portland, with two  towers and a  navigational clearance. The adjacent park and neighborhood of Cathedral Park are named after the Gothic Cathedral-like design of the bridge's towers and supports.

History
Designed by consulting engineers David B. Steinman (1886–1960) and Holton D. Robinson, of New York, the St. Johns was the longest suspension-type bridge west of the Mississippi River at the time of construction. It is the only major highway suspension bridge in the Willamette Valley and one of only three major highway suspension bridges in Oregon.

At the time of the proposal to build the bridge, the area was served by a ferry that carried 1,000 vehicles a day. The proposal for a bridge was initially met with skepticism in Multnomah County, since St. Johns and Linnton were over five miles (8 km) from the heart of the city, and local business owners had minimal political clout. But after a lobbying effort that included a vaudeville-style show performed at grange halls and schools throughout the county, voters approved a $4.25 million bond for the bridge in the November 1928 elections. Initially, a cantilever bridge was proposed, but a suspension bridge was selected due to an estimated $640,000 savings in construction costs.

The construction of the bridge began a month before the Stock Market Crash of 1929 and provided many county residents with employment during the Great Depression. Because of its proximity to the Swan Island Municipal Airport, some government officials wanted the bridge painted yellow with black stripes. County officials waited until St. Patrick's Day 1931 to announce that it would be painted green.

Dedication of the bridge was put off for one month in order to make it the centerpiece of the 23rd annual Rose Festival. It was dedicated on June 13, 1931, and during the ceremony, the bridge engineer, David B. Steinman, said: 

The bridge was built within 21 months and one million dollars under budget. At the time of its completion, the bridge had:
 the highest clearance in the nation,
 the longest prefabricated steel cable rope strands,
 the tallest steel frame piers of reinforced concrete,
 the first application of aviation clearance lights to the towers, and
 longest suspension span west of Detroit, Michigan.

Eighteen years later, in the summer of 1949, 15-year-old high school student Thelma Taylor was abducted and held by her captor, Morris Leland, under the east side of the bridge (which was undeveloped at the time, now the location of Cathedral Park), and was eventually murdered there. The crime shocked the city and her killer was apprehended and put to death.

It was not until the Marquam Bridge in 1966 that another non-movable bridge would be built in Portland.

By the 1970s, the bridge had been allowed to deteriorate, and cash-strapped Multnomah County asked the state to take over maintenance. Initially, the state declined, since it was also suffering from a lack of funds. But pressure from an association of county governments forced the state government to take it over on August 31, 1975. A county official estimated the move saved them $10 million during the first ten years of state maintenance.

Portions of the east approaches and east span were repainted beginning in 1987 and completed in 1994.

In 1999, the Oregon Department of Transportation announced a $27 million rehabilitation project that began in March 2003 and was completed in the fall of 2005. Included in the project was replacement of the deck, repainting of the towers, waterproofing the main cables, lighting upgrades, and improving access for bicycle and pedestrian traffic. By November 2004, renovation costs soared to $38 million, due mostly to the need to replace nearly half of the 210 vertical suspender cables. During the project, the bridge sidewalks were closed at all times. In addition, the entire bridge was closed at night and continuously for a month. The newly refurbished bridge was rededicated on September 17, 2006.

In July 2015, a group of protesters affiliated with Greenpeace rappelled down from the bridge to prevent the icebreaker MSV Fennica from leaving Portland, because it was destined to help Shell Oil Company drill for oil in the Chukchi Sea. They stayed there for forty hours, prompting the icebreaker to turn around after an initial departure attempt a few hours into the blockade. The vessel did eventually get through after three climbers came down, although it was met by dozens of kayakers in the water who joined the effort to slow or stop the ship from moving forward.

In March 2019, a partially finished elaborate illegal skate park was discovered in the bridge's cable house located under the west side of the bridge. Following concerns about the skatepark's impacts on structural integrity of bridge, it was torn down in 2020.

See also

List of bridges documented by the Historic American Engineering Record in Oregon
List of bridges in the United States by height
List of crossings of the Willamette River

References

External links

1931 establishments in Oregon
Bridges completed in 1931
Bridges in Portland, Oregon
Bridges of the United States Numbered Highway System
Bridges over the Willamette River
Cathedral Park, Portland, Oregon
Historic American Engineering Record in Oregon
Portland Historic Landmarks
Road bridges in Oregon
Steel bridges in the United States
Suspension bridges in the United States
U.S. Route 30